Hawaii Youth Symphony is a statewide youth orchestra in Hawaii. Students come from many different Hawaiian islands and the orchestra consists of hundreds of students. The Hawaii Youth Symphony has been training students since 1964 and is one of the largest and oldest youth symphonies in the country.

Programs 
The Hawaii Youth Symphony, is Divided into four sections, the Hawaii Youth Symphony Academy, String Program, Symphony Program, and Summer Program.

The Academy consists of Music4Kids, a general music class held on Tuesdays and Thursdays at the Boy's & Girls Club. Students in this class are members of the Boy's & Girls Club and are seven to nine years old. The Boy's & Girl's Club Band is a beginning band class with members being 10 to 18 years old.

Summer String Program is a daily five-week session for beginners and intermediate players. For advanced and high school musicians, Pacific Music Institute (PMI) is a one-week program offered by the Symphony Program. 

All groups in the Symphony Program have rehearsals that consist of wind, percussion, and string sectionals and a full orchestra rehearsal. Groups in the Symphony program attend two half-day workshops a season which include professional instructions for each section, separate string and wind, brass, and percussion instructions and a full orchestra rehearsal.

Conductors and teachers 
 Henry Miyamura, Music Director & Conductor, YSI
 Maestro Miyamura graduated from President William McKinley High School. He received his Bachelor of Music and Performer's Certificate from Eastman School of Music and his Masters of Music degree from Western Washington University. Maestro Miyamura was the band director at his alma mater for 14 years, the principal clarinetist in the Honolulu Symphony, a member of Eastman Wind Ensemble, the Hillel Chamber Concert Orchestra, and Rochester Philharmonic Orchestra.
 Derrick Yamane, Conductor, YSII
 Yamane received his Masters of secondary education and Bachelor of Music at the University of Hawaii at Manoa. Yamane was formerly the Conductor of the Concert Orchestra for 11 years.
 Elton Masaki, Associate Conductor, YSII
 Masaki received his Bachelor of education in secondary education with an emphasis in music from the University of Hawaii at Manoa and a Masters of music in education degree from Boston University. Masaki is presently pursuing a PhD in Education with an emphasis in technology from the University of Hawaii at Manoa. He has also been at Mid-Pacific Institute since 2005 as the orchestra director.
 Susan, Ochi-Onishi, Conductor, CO
 Ochi-Onishi received her Bachelor of music and a PDMUS Secondary Music Education degree from the University of Hawaii at Manoa. Ochi-Onishi received her Master of Music degree from Northwestern University and studied oboe and English horn.
 Hannah Watanabe, Associate Conductor, CO
 Watanabe is a former member of the Hawaii Youth Symphony and graduated from Kalani High School. Watanabe received her bachelor's degree in music from the University of Hawaii at Manoa . Watanabe is a teacher at Moanalua Middle School and has taught previously at Hawaii Baptist Academy, Moanalua High School and her alma mater, Kalani High School.
 Chad Uyehara, Conductor, CSO, SOE and Summer Strings
 Uyehara is a graduate of Punahou School. Uyehara received his Masters of music in music education and Viola performance from Northwestern University and Bachelors of music in violin performance and Bachelors of arts in French from the University of Hawaii at Manoa. Uyehara has been a member of the Las Vegas Philharmonic Orchestra, Desert Springs Chamber Orchestra, and the Honolulu Symphony as both a violinist and violaist. He has taught at Clark County School District, Nevada, Las Vegas Youth Philharmonic, and throughout the Hawaii Department of Education: Kalani High School, Kaimuki Middle School, and Moanalua Elementary. Presently, Uyehara is at Saint Andrew's Priory teaching orchestra.
 Joan Doike, Conductor, BSE and ISE
 Doike received her Bachelors of music from the University of Hawaii at Manoa. Doike had previously conducted orchestras in the Hawaii Youth Symphony programs for 14 years. Doike also gives private lessons. While at Kaimuki Intermediate and Kalani High School, Doike was a violinist in the Hawaii Youth Symphony.

Auditions 
Students auditioning for Youth Symphony I must be 13 years old by January 1 and in high school. Students auditioning for Youth Symphony II must be 12 years old by January 1 and 8 grade. Students auditioning for Concert Orchestra must be 10 by January 1 and 6 grade. Students auditioning for Concert String Orchestra and String Orchestra Ensemble must be eight years old by August 1 and in the third grade. Students in Intermediate string Orchestra and Beginning String Orchestra do not have to audition but must be 8 years old by August first and in the third grade. Students in the Boys & Girls Club Band must be a member and are 10–18 years of age. Students in Music4Kids must be 7–9 years of age.

Awards 
During its 50th year anniversary the Hawaii Youth Symphony received the Na Hoku Hanohano Award for its “He Makana O Na Mele” concert album.

See also
Hawaii Symphony
Music of Hawaii

References

External links
Hawaii Youth Symphony on iTunes

American youth orchestras
Orchestras based in Hawaii
Native Hawaiian musicians
Performing arts in Hawaii
1964 establishments in Hawaii
Musical groups established in 1964